Cidarina is a genus of sea snails, marine gastropod mollusks in the family Eucyclidae.

Species
Species within the genus Cidarina include:
 Cidarina cidaris (Carpenter, 1864)

References

External links
 To ITIS
 To World Register of Marine Species

 
Eucyclidae
Monotypic gastropod genera